Lidia Bongiovanni (Turin, 1 October 1914 – 18 February 1998) was an Italian versatile athlete.

Achievements

National titles
Lidia Bongiovanni has won one national championship.
1 win in  Standing high jump (1931)

See also
 Italy national relay team

References

External links
 

1914 births
1998 deaths
Italian female discus throwers
Italian female sprinters
Italian female high jumpers
Athletes (track and field) at the 1936 Summer Olympics
Sportspeople from Turin
Olympic athletes of Italy
20th-century Italian women